Correos de Chile, also known as CorreosChile (ChilePost —not to be confused with the private mail and courier company ChilePost), is a Chilean state-owned and autonomous enterprise dedicated to the mailing, money transfers, and national/international courier services, and fulfilling the functions of Universal Postal Service.

It can trace its history back to the establishment of the first postal service in 1747, in the Captaincy General of Chile. The current state-owned enterprise was created by the DFL N° 10, December 24 of 1981, dissolving the previous SOE Servicio de Correos y Telégrafos, separating mailing and Telex services, founding Telex-Chile (that was extinguished as a service following the rise of the internet, but still exists legally as enterprise, providing other telecommunications services). It is administratively under the Ministry of Transport and Telecommunications.

Notes

External links 

 Sitio oficial de Correos de Chile 
 Sociedad Filatélica de Chile - Philately Society of Chile 
 ChileCollector 
 FilateliaChile Philately Chile 

Chile
1747 establishments in the Captaincy General of Chile
Government-owned companies of Chile
Companies of Chile
Philately of Chile